Sambalanço Trio is the debut album by Brazilian samba-jazz group Sambalanço Trio, released in 1964. The album was reissued later that year as Samblues.

Reception

Writing for Allmusic, critic John Vallier writes that the group "had a sophisticated and multi-faceted sound, one that melded an aggressive, samba-school-on-parade sound with a subtler air, redolent of Antonio Carlos Jobim, João Gilberto, and even the Bill Evans Trio". The album, he writes, "infused the soporific bossa nova scene of 1964 with much-needed doses of energetic rhythms, cutting-edge jazz voicings, and spontaneity".

Track listing
"Samblues" (César Camargo Mariano) – 2:13	
"Balanço Zona Sul" (Tito Madi) – 2:31	
"O Morro Não Tem Vez" (Antônio Carlos Jobim, Vinícius de Moraes) – 3:42	
"Nós E O Mar" (Ronaldo Bôscoli, Roberto Menescal) – 2:15	
"Homenagem a Clifford Brown" – 2:39	
"Berimbau" (Vinícius de Moraes, Baden Powell) – 3:50	
"Jacqueline K" – 2:45
"Consolação" (Vinícius de Moraes, Baden Powell) – 2:35
"O Amor Que Acabou" (Chico Feitosa, Lula Freire) – 3:10	
"P'ra Que Chorar" (Vinícius de Moraes, Baden Powell) – 2:26	
"Marisa" (César Camargo Mariano) – 3:00	
"Sambinha" – 2:10

Personnel
Cesar Camargo Mariano – piano
Humberto Clayber – bass
Airto Moreira – drums

References

Sambalanço Trio albums
1964 debut albums